Agha Rafiq Ahmed Khan (born 23 August 1949) a Pakistani jurist belongs to Garhi Yasin in Shikarpur District of Sindh, Pakistan. He is the son-in-law of Justice Mushtak Ali Kazi, who was a Judge of High Court of Sindh and Balochistan. Justice Agha is a Senior Advocate of the Supreme Court of Pakistan. He served as the 12th Chief Justice of the Federal Shariat Court of Pakistan from 2009-2014.

Early life and family
He belongs to the Royal Pathan Barakzai Family, from Afghanistan and is also related to Ahmad Shah Durrani of Persia. He is the son of Agha Mohammad Anwer Khan, an agriculturist and was educated at D.C. High School in Garhi Yasin. Subsequently, he graduated from the C&S Government College, Shikarpur and also graduated in Law from the University of Sindh in 1971.

He is married to Mrs Farzeen Agha, and has four children namely, Agha Haris and Agha Fahad, Hira Agha Shah and Sanaah Agha Shah. Three of their children are married, and the fourth one is young and is pursuing his studies.

Legal career
Justice Agha was enrolled as a member of the Sindh Bar Council in 1972. He joined Sindh Judicial Services as a civil judge and first class magistrate in 1973 through competitive examination of the Sindh Public Service Commission. He was promoted as senior civil judge and assistant sessions judge in 1978, and subsequently as additional district and sessions judge in 1983. In 1985, he was appointed as Secretary of the Sindh Legislative Assembly. He attended a Shariah training course in the International Islamic University in Islamabad in 1984. He was appointed as director of administration and legal services of Pakistan International Airlines in 1989. Reverting to his judicial career, he was promoted as district and sessions judge in May 1990. He also held the position of additional secretary for regulations in the Services and General Administration Department of the Government of Sindh. He assumed the charge of law secretary to the Government of Sindh in 1994, and was elevated as additional judge of the High Court of Sindh in 1995 and confirmed as a judge of the same court in 1996. However, he reverted to the Sindh Judiciary after a decision in the Al-Jehad Trust case and was posted as district and sessions judge in various districts of Sindh from 1997 to 2007. He was again elevated as additional judge of the Sindh High Court on 14 December 2007. After a few months, he was appointed secretary to the Government of Pakistan, Law and Justice Division in 2008. He was again confirmed as a permanent judge of the Sindh High Court during December 2008, retaining his original seniority from 1995. He was elevated as Chief Justice of the Federal Shariat Court of Pakistan on 5 June 2009.

Chief Justice of the Federal Shariat Court

Justice Agha Rafiq took the oath as the 12th Chief Justice of the Federal Shariat Court on 5 June 2009; President of Pakistan Asif Ali Zardari administered the oath of office at Aiwan-e-Sadr. Prime Minister of Pakistan Yousuf Raza Gillani and Chief Justice of Pakistan Iftikhar Muhammad Chaudhry were also present.

Appointment as Chairman Sindh Public Service Commission
Justice Agha was appointed as Chairman of the Sindh Public Service Commission in June 2014 for a period of five years, however he resigned just six months after he took office due to undue interference of the Government of Sindh. He took strict measures to uphold merit and to eradicate corruption within the institution during his tenure .

Honors
As Justice Agha attended the 2nd Arab Countries Chief Justice Conference in 2011. He had invited the chief justices of Oman, Sudan, Egypt, Jordan, Morocco and Qatar. All of them visited Pakistan on his invitation in March, April, and May 2012. In February 2013, Kamal B.A. Dhan, Chief Justice of Libya, visited Pakistan and strengthened the judicial ties between Libya and Pakistan. In June 2013, Justice Sidi Yahefdhou, Chief Justice of Mauritania also visited Pakistan.

Justice Dr Agha Rafiq was awarded with the Honoris Causa Doctorate of Law Degree by the University if Sindh on 26 January 2014 at Karachi. He is the first ever judge in Pakistan to receive the degree.

See also

 Justice Mushtak Ali Kazi
Chief Justice of the Federal Shariat Court
Federal Law Secretary of Pakistan

References

Judges of the Sindh High Court
1949 births
Living people
People from Shikarpur District
Pashtun people